David Sassoon (October 1792 – 7 November 1864) was the treasurer of Baghdad between 1817 and 1829. He became the leader of the Jewish community in Mumbai after Baghdadi Jews emigrated there.

Life and career

Sassoon was born in Baghdad, where his father, Sassoon ben Saleh (1750-1830), was a wealthy businessman, chief treasurer to the pashas (the governors of Baghdad) from 1781 to 1817, and president (Nasi) of the city's Jewish community.

The family were Iraqi Jews. His mother was Amam Gabbai. After a traditional education in the Hebrew language, Sassoon married Hannah Joseph in 1818. They had two sons and two daughters before she died in 1826. Two years later he married Farha Hyeem (born 1812 - died 1886). The pair had six sons and three daughters.

Following increasing persecution of Baghdad's Jews by Dawud Pasha, the family moved to Bombay via Persia. Sassoon was in business in Bombay no later than 1832, originally acting as a middleman between British textile firms and Persian Gulf commodity merchants, subsequently investing in valuable harbour properties. His major competitors were Parsis, whose profits were built on their domination of the Sino-Indian opium trade since the 1820s.

When the Treaty of Nanking opened up China to British traders, Sassoon developed his textile operations into a profitable triangular trade: Indian yarn and opium were carried to China, where he bought goods which were sold in Britain, from where he obtained Lancashire cotton products. He sent his son, Elias, to Canton, where he was the first Jewish trader (with 24 Parsi rivals). In 1845, David Sassoon & Co. opened an office in what would soon become Shanghai's British concession, and it became the firm's second hub of operations. In 1844, he set up a branch in Hong Kong, and a year later, he set up his Shanghai branch on The Bund to cash in on the opium trade.

It was not until the 1860s that the Sassoons were able to lead the Baghdadi Jewish community in overtaking Parsi dominance. A particular opportunity was given by the American Civil War, during which turmoil American cotton exports from the South declined. Lancashire factories replaced American cotton imports with Sassoon's Indian cotton.

Along with Parsi businessmen such as Sir Jamsetjee Jejeebhoy, David Sassoon continued the trade with China and from the wealth earned there he started his own business of oil. His first mill was named E.D. Sassoon Mills and he became exceedingly prosperous. Later, the Sassoons were the largest mill owners and were known as Badshah of the business community of Bombay. Overall there were 17 mills, employing in total some 15,000 to 20,000 slaves and workers. Later, Sassoon also entered the cotton, fabrics and various other industries on a large scale. Sassoon, as an Orthodox Jew, continued his Jewish religious observances, observing the Jewish Sabbath throughout his busy life. He was also a member of the Legislative Assembly of the time. He built one of the largest and most beautiful synagogues of India, the Magen David synagogue at Byculla, Bombay. He also built the Ohel David Synagogue of Pune. 

Various charity trusts, which continue in existence today, were funded from his private income and named after him and other members of his family. David Sassoon funded monuments and educational institutions in Mumbai. By his enterprise, Sassoon Docks at Colaba in the city were built, much of it with slave labor.

He soon came to live with his family at a palatial home he reconfigured and named Byculla's Bungalow or Sans Souci, the former palace of Shin Sangoo. This was later donated to the Parsi Trust and is today's Masina Hospital. Nearby Rani Bagh (Jijamata Udyann) was also his property and was donated to the Mumbai Municipal Corporation for the construction of the Albert Museum, designed by the most prominent architect of the time. The interior is exactly like the Magen David synagogue and the Ohel David Synagogue of Pune. It has a tall clock tower, the Victoria clock tower.

Legacy 

Although David Sassoon did not speak English, in 1853 he became a naturalised British subject. He kept the dress and manners of the Baghdadi Jews, but allowed his sons to adopt English manners. His son, Abdullah changed his name to Albert, moved to England, became a Baronet and married into the Rothschild family. All the Sassoons of Europe are said to be descendants of David Sassoon. He built a synagogue in the Fort (area) and another in Byculla, as well as a school, a Mechanics' Institute, a library and a convalescent home in Pune. David Sassoon was conscious of his role as a leader of the Jewish community in Mumbai. He helped to arouse a sense of Jewish identity among the Bene Israeli and Cochin Jewish communities. The Sassoon Docks (built by his son) and the David Sassoon Library are named after him.

David Sassoon died in his country house in Pune in 1864 and was buried in a mausoleum at the Ohel David Synagogue.  His business interests were inherited by his son Sir Albert Sassoon; Elias David had established a rival firm. His grandson David Solomon Sassoon was a renowned bibliophile.

Some of the prominent Buildings built by David Sasoon and his family are:
David Sassoon Library & reading room, Fort Mumbai
Magen David Synagogue, Byculla, Mumbai
Jacob Sasooon High School, Byculla, Mumbai
E.E.E. Sassoon High School, Byculla, Mumbai
David Sassoon Hospital, JJ Hospital Premises, Byculla, Mumbai
 Masina Hospital, Byculla, Mumbai
Knesset Eliyahoo Synagogue, Colaba, Mumbai
Sassoon Dock, Colaba, Mumbai
The Bank of India, Fort (head office), Mumbai
The David Sassoon Reformary and Deaf school, Matunga, Mumbai
Ohel David Synagogue, Pune
Sassoon Hospital, Pune
Lady Rachel Sassoon Dispensary, Pune
David Sassoon Elderly and Destitute Persons Home (1863), Pune (today's Nivara Old Age Home)
Sassoon House

They have contributed to the construction of:

Gateway of India
Sassoon Building of Elphinstone Technical High School, Mumbai
The Institute of Science, Mumbai
Clock Tower at The Victoria Gardens
The Victoria and Albert Museum

See also
 Sassoon family
 David Sassoon & Co.
 E.D. Sassoon & Co.
 History of opium in China

References

Chiara Betta 'Marginal Westerners in Shanghai: the Baghdadi Jewish community, 1845-1931' in Robert Bickers and Christian Henriot New Frontiers: imperialism's new communities in East Asia, 1842-1953 (Manchester University Press 2000: pp. 38–54),  p.38ff.
Oxford Dictionary of National Biography, Sassoon family
Biography from the Tata Institute of Fundamental Research
 Jewish Encyclopedia.com

External links
 
David Sasoon in the Jewish Encyclopedia

1792 births
1864 deaths
Iraqi Jews
People from Baghdad
Bibliophiles
David
Founders of Indian schools and colleges
Immigrants to British India
Emigrants from the Ottoman Empire
Indian Jews
Baghdadi Jews